Divisoria station is a proposed Manila Light Rail Transit (LRT) station situated on Line 2. It is part of the Line 2 West Extension project, a  extension from Recto station to the Manila North Harbor in Tondo. The west extension project calls for the construction of three additional elevated stations,  two on Recto Avenue and one on Mel Lopez Boulevard near Pier 4 of the Manila North Harbor. It was approved by the National Economic and Development Authority last May 19, 2015.

The station would be the second for trains headed west from Recto and the eleventh for trains headed from Antipolo. It would be located west of the intersection of Recto Avenue with Asuncion Street.

Currently, the station is on the planning stages.

References

Manila Light Rail Transit System stations
Proposed railway stations in the Philippines